Lidija Vera Manić (Pirot, 1953)  was a Serbian model and beauty queen who became the first woman from Yugoslavia to win a major international title after being crowned Miss International 1975 in Motobu, Japan.

Miss International
Manić was succeeded by French delegate Sophie Perin as Miss International in 1976. Incidentally, Perin and Manić were delegates of their respective countries in the 1975 Miss Universe pageant held in San Salvador, El Salvador.

Yugoslavia had disintegrated  into several countries since 1992, Manić remained the only winner of a major beauty pageant from Yugoslavia, beside Saša Zajc, Miss Europe 1969.

References

External links
Official Miss International website - Past winners

1950s births
Living people
Miss International 1975 delegates
Miss International winners
Miss Universe 1975 contestants
Serbian beauty pageant winners
Yugoslav beauty pageant winners